Richard Jones may refer to:

Arts and entertainment
F. Richard Jones (1893–1930), American filmmaker
Dick Clair (Richard Jones, 1931–1988), American producer, actor and TV writer
Richard Jones (The Feeling), British bass guitarist
Richard Jones (composer) (died 1744), violinist and composer
Richard Jones (director) (born 1953), British opera director
Richard Jones (Stereophonics) (born 1974), Welsh bass guitarist
Richard M. Jones (1892–1945), American jazz musician
Richard T. Jones (born 1972), American actor
Richard Tyrone Jones (born 1980), performance poet, writer and comedian
Richard Jones (photojournalist), British photojournalist
Richard Jones (poet), American poet
Dick Jones (actor) (1927–2014), American actor
Richard Jones (magician) (born 1990), talent show winner
Dick Jones, senior vice president of OCP in the movie RoboCop
Richard Jones, fictional character in Babel
Richard Jones (Neighbours), fictional character in the Australian soap opera Neighbours

Sportsmen
Richard Jones (cricketer, born 1857) (1857–1935), English lawyer and a cricketer
Richard Owen Jones (1867–1936), Bangor F.C. and Wales international footballer
Richard Jones (cricketer, born 1871) (1871–1940), English cricketer
Richard Jones (footballer, born 1875) (1875–?), Leicester Fosse F.C. and Wales international footballer
Richard Jones (footballer, born 1878) (1878–1938), Druids F.C. and Wales international footballer
Richard Jones (footballer, born 1879) (1879–?), Millwall Athletic F.C., Manchester City F.C. and Wales international footballer
Dick Jones (Australian footballer) (born 1926), Australian rules footballer 
Dick Jones (rugby union) (1879–1958), Welsh international rugby union footballer
Dickie Jones (footballer, born 1874), English footballer
Dicky Jones (footballer, born 1901), English footballer
Richard Jones (footballer, born 1969), Welsh footballer with Hereford United F.C., Barry Town F.C. and others
Richard Jones (chess player) (born 1983), Welsh chess player
Richard Jones (New Zealand cricketer) (born 1973), New Zealand cricketer
Richard Jones (cricketer, born 1916) (1916–2004), English cricketer
Richard Jones (cricketer, born 1986), English cricketer (Worcestershire)
Richard Jones (racing driver) (born 1949), British former racing driver
Ritchie Jones (born 1986), English footballer
Dick Jones (baseball) (1902–1994), American baseball player
Richard Jones (sprinter) (born 1973), Guyanese Olympic sprinter
Richard Jones (Trinidadian runner) (born 1976), Trinidadian distance runner and competitor at the 2007 IAAF World Road Running Championships
Richard Jones (New Zealand runner) (born 1973), New Zealand middle-distance runner and national record holder
Itch Jones (Richard Jones, born 1939), college baseball coach

Diplomats, lawyers and politicians
Richard Jones (MP for Carmarthenshire), in 1555 and 1559, MP for Carmarthenshire
Richard Jones (Tasmanian politician) (1936–1986), co-founder of the United Tasmania Group (UTG), the world's first Green party
Richard Jones (U.S. diplomat) (born 1950), American diplomat
Richard Jones (British diplomat) (born 1962), former British Ambassador to Albania
Richard Jones, 1st Earl of Ranelagh (1641–1712), Irish nobleman and politician
Richard Jones (died 1729), Irish MP for Donegal Borough
Richard Jones (died 1736), British MP for Marlborough and Salisbury
Richard Jones (died 1790), Irish MP for Killybegs and Newtown Limavady
Richard A. Jones (born 1950), U.S. federal judge
Dick Jones (Wyoming politician) (1910–2008)
Dick Jones (Kansas politician) (born 1942), American politician
Richard Jones (MP for Radnor) (born 1578), Welsh politician who sat in the House of Commons between 1628 and 1640

Politicians from NSW, Australia
Richard Jones (1786–1852) or Richard Jones Snr, father of Richard Jones Jnr, member of the NSW Legislative Council (1856–1860)
Richard Jones (New South Wales politician, born 1843) (1843–1909), or Richard Jones Jnr, son of Richard Jones Snr, member of the NSW Legislative Council (1899–1909)
Richard Jones (1816–1892),  member of the Legislative Assembly (1843–1848) and Colonial Treasurer (1857–1858)
Richard Jones (New South Wales politician, born 1940), member of the NSW Legislative Council (1988-2003)

Other occupations
Richard Jones (Anglican priest) (1603–1655/6), Welsh priest and writer
Richard Jones (bishop) (died 1953), Welsh Anglican bishop
Richard Jones (doctor), Australian medical doctor
Richard Jones (East India Company officer) (1754–1835), Bombay Army general
Richard Jones (economist) (1790–1855), English economist
Richard Jones (Ruthin priest) (c. 1757–1814), Welsh priest and writer
Richard A. Jones (physicist) (born 1961), professor of physics at the University of Manchester
Richard Bathoe Jones (1830–1916), Anglican priest in Ireland
Richard Basil Brandram Jones (1897–1916), English soldier and recipient of the Victoria Cross
Richard D. P. Jones, English musicologist
Richard Foster Jones (1886–1965), American classical scholar
Richard Lloyd Jones (1873–1963), editor and publisher of the Tulsa Tribune
Richard R. Jones (1853–1921), American Baptist minister
Richard Stanton-Jones (1926–1991), English aeronautical engineer
Richard Victor Jones (1929–2019), American physicist and professor
Richard W. Jones (1904–1987), biomedical engineer and authority on physiological control systems
Richard Wyn Jones, Welsh academic at Cardiff University
 Richard Jones, the real name of computer hacker Electron
 Richard Jones, a pen-name of Theodore Hook (1788–1841)

Other uses
Richard Jones (department store), a department store in Chester, England

See also
Rich Jones (disambiguation)
Rick Jones (disambiguation)
Ricky Jones (disambiguation)

Jones, Richard